Andrea Isabel Toscano Ramírez is a Mexican model and beauty pageant titleholder who won Mexicana Universal 2018 on June 3, 2018. She represented Mexico at Miss Universe 2018 pageant but was unplaced. Toscano represented Mexico at Miss International 2019 and placed first runner-up.

Pageantry

Mexicana Universal 2018  
Toscano began her pageantry career representing Colima, one of 24 finalists in her country's national beauty pageant Mexicana Universal 2018, held on June 3, 2018, in Foro de TV Azteca, Ciudad de México, México where she was crowned as Miss Universe Mexico 2018. She succeeded outgoing Nuestra Belleza México 2017 Denisse Franco.

Miss Universe 2018 
As Mexicana Universal, Toscano represented Mexico at the Miss Universe 2018 pageant in Bangkok, Thailand. The eventual winner was Catriona Gray of the Philippines.

Miss International 2019 
On 23 June 2019, Toscano was appointed by Mexicana Universal Organization as the representative of Mexico in the 59th Miss International pageant, to be held in Japan on November 12, 2019.

References

External links
mexicanauniversal.com
missuniverse.com

Living people
1998 births
Miss Universe 2018 contestants
Miss International 2019 delegates
Mexican beauty pageant winners
Mexican female models
People from Manzanillo, Colima
Mexicana Universal winners